Ioannis Karalogos (born 27 September 1949) is a Greek former water polo player. He competed in the men's tournament at the 1972 Summer Olympics. He played at club level for Greek powerhouse club Ethnikos Piraeus.

References

External links
 

1949 births
Living people
Greek male water polo players
Olympic water polo players of Greece
Water polo players at the 1972 Summer Olympics
Place of birth missing (living people)
Ethnikos Piraeus Water Polo Club players
20th-century Greek people